Digital television in the United States is available via digital terrestrial television (DTT), digital cable, satellite television, and IPTV providers (including those delivered over private networks, and those delivered as over-the-top streaming television services over the public internet).

Digital terrestrial television (DTT) uses the ATSC standards, replacing the NTSC standards used for analog television, and offering capabilities such as high definition (HD) signals and digital subchannels. All full-power television stations in the United States were required to shut down their analog signals, and transition exclusively to digital broadcasting by June 12, 2009. Class A low-power analog stations were required to transition by September 1, 2015, while all other low-power stations, as well as analog rebroadcasters, were required to transition by July 13, 2021.

In November 2017, the FCC approved ATSC 3.0 (Next Gen TV), an updated version of the ATSC standards that supports High Efficiency Video Coding (HEVC), video resolutions of up to 4K ultra high-definition (4K UHD), 120 Hz frame rate, high-dynamic-range (HDR) color, datacasting, and mobile television. Unlike the original digital transition, ATSC 3.0 is a voluntary standard, and broadcasters are not required to adopt it. However, those that do must continue to provide legacy ATSC signals with "substantially similar" programming.

Standards 

The U.S. opted to adhere to ATSC standards for broadcast digital television. These standards define, among other things, format and transmission criteria that ensure consistency, accessibility, and fairness for consumers and equipment manufacturers alike in the U.S., as well as international compatibility.

Format standards 

The five main ATSC formats of DTV currently broadcast in the U.S. are:
 Standard definition—480i, to maintain compatibility with existing NTSC sets when a digital television broadcast is converted back to an analog one—either by a converter box or a cable/satellite operator's proprietary equipment
 Enhanced definition—480p, about the same quality as DVDs
 High definition—720p
 High definition—1080i
 High definition—1080p (only used by a few cable operators and some terrestrial stations broadcast in 1080p)

Most digital television sets sold in the U.S. use a display with a 16:9 aspect ratio to optimally display HDTV-formatted content.  Lower-resolution sources like regular DVDs may be upscaled to the native resolution of the TV.

Transmission standards

Pay television 
Many Americans get digital television broadcasts via cable or satellite. Digital cable television systems with an active channel capacity of 750 MHz or greater, are required by the FCC to follow ANSI/SCTE transmission standards with the exception of cable systems that only pass through 8 VSB modulated signals. Digital television sets (equipped with ATSC tuners) are often capable of viewing a baseline set of unencrypted digital programming, known as basic cable or low-tier channels, which typically include local network television affiliates. 

According to FCC regulations, television providers must provide "separable security" for accessing encrypted programming. Until 2020, the FCC specifically mandated CableCARD, a smart card standard developed by an industry consortium, for this purpose.

Terrestrial 
Digital television transmissions over-the-air (OTA) are available in metropolitan areas in the U.S., often carrying both standard-definition and high-definition (HDTV) transmissions of the same stations.  As of the analog shut-off date of June 12, 2009, all full power OTA stations in the U.S. by law either transmitted their broadcasts digitally, or shut down.

Many stations used the switch to digital transmission as an opportunity to transition from 480i broadcasts to digital HD OTA broadcasts (either in 720p or 1080i), though this change is voluntary.

Within a distance of 35 to 40 miles from the broadcast stations, it is possible that a simple antenna (such as "rabbit ears") may be adequate to receive a DTV broadcast signal OTA—at least some of the time for some of the channels.  Any television equipped with an ATSC tuner may display DTV broadcasts properly.  Some customers discovered that terrain, trees, rain, snow, wind, and movement of people around the room interfere with reception to one degree or another, from signals breaking up to total loss of signal. (Few modern ATSC-equipped televisions or converter boxes have internal antennas, in contrast to analog sets available in years past).

Broadcast TV signals in the United States are horizontally polarized.

Transition from analog to digital terrestrial broadcasts in 2009 

It was estimated that as of April 2007, 28% of American households had an HDTV set, a total of 35 million sets, and that 86% of owners were highly satisfied with the HDTV programming All TV stations currently broadcast in both digital and analog and major networks broadcast in HD in most markets.

While many in the industry wanted a flexible or delayed deadline, the FCC forced the issue at the behest of Congress. Congress wanted to reclaim some of the spectrum used for analog and repurpose that for emergency services. They also wanted to auction off bandwidth between 76-88 MHz frequencies (channels 5 and 6) and old analog UHF channels 60 to 69, and channels 52 to 59 by mandating DTV tuners be phased into all new TV sets.   Many transition dates were proposed, but Congress finally fixed February 17, 2009 (later extending it until June 12, 2009), in law as the maximum end date for analog television authorizations. Because this date comes after the NCAA's Bowl Championship Series and the NFL's Super Bowl XLIII, there will be less of a chance of an acute hardware shortage from people waiting until the last minute to purchase an ATSC tuner than there would have been with a January 1 cutoff.

In March 2008, the FCC requested public comment on turning over the bandwidth occupied by analog television channels 5 and 6 (76–88 MHz) to extend the FM broadcast band when the digital television transition was to be completed in February 2009 (ultimately delayed to June 2009). This proposed allocation would effectively assign frequencies corresponding to the existing Japanese FM radio service (which begins at 76 MHz) for use as an extension to the existing North American FM broadcast band.

Ultimately, VHF Channels 5 and 6 were retained for digital broadcast television use after the transition, though the FCC had continued researching the possibility of re-allocating the two channels to an expanded FM band.

On August 22, 2011, the United States' Federal Communications Commission announced a freeze on all future applications for broadcast stations requesting to use channel 51, to prevent adjacent-channel interference to the A-Block of the 700 MHz band. On December 16, 2011, Industry Canada and the CRTC followed suit in placing a moratorium on any future Channel 51 television station applications.

Early rollout of transition 

On May 8, 2008, FCC Chairman Kevin J. Martin announced the agency would test run the transition to digital terrestrial television in Wilmington, North Carolina, beginning September 8, 2008. This test run was to work out problems that might have occurred before the complete transition.

See also 
Digital television transition in the United States
High-definition television in the United States
Pan-American television frequencies
Coupon-eligible converter box (CECB)

References

External links
"The Digital TV Transition: What You Need to Know About DTV"  (FCC)
DTV Transition (DTV Transition Coalition)
AntennaWeb (local availability of OTA DTV broadcasts, including HD)

 
United States
Science and technology in the United States